A list of North Queensland Cowboys records since they entered the Australian Rugby League in 1995. These stats are correct as of the end of the 2021 season.

Individual Records

Most first grade games

Most points for the club

Most tries for the club

Most tries in a match

Most points in a match

Most goals in a match

Most tries in a season

Most points in a season

Youngest players to debut

Oldest players

Team

Biggest Wins

Biggest Losses

Golden Point Results

All Time Premiership Record

Regular season

Streaks

Most consecutive wins
 11 – March 30, 2015 to June 27, 2015
 7 – August 8, 2007 to September 16, 2007
 6 – March 12, 2006 to April 16, 2006
 6 – August 27, 2006 to April 7, 2007

Most consecutive losses
 13 – April 26, 2008 to August 2, 2008
 10 – July 25, 1998 to April 10, 1999
 10 – June 11, 2021 to August 21, 2021

Comebacks

Biggest comeback
 Trailed Penrith Panthers 26-0 at half time to win 36-28 at Penrith Park, Round 12, 1998 (Biggest comeback in league history).

Crowds

Top home attendances

See also
 List of North Queensland Cowboys players
 List of North Queensland Cowboys honours
 List of North Queensland Cowboys representatives

References

North Queensland Cowboys
National Rugby League lists
Australian records
Rugby league records and statistics